Ogelle  is an African online video-sharing platform headquartered in Rwanda and Nigeria and operated by Reddot Television Network Limited. Ogelle was launched on 18 April 2019 with the announcement made by Reddot Television Network founder Osita Oparaugo, during the official launch in Lagos, Nigeria.

Dubbed the "YouTube" of Africa, Ogelle is the first African only user-generated content resource and entertainment platform. Available content includes video clips, TV show clips, films, music, comedy, tourism, cuisine, vocation, news and lifestyle which are all created and produced by Africans.

History 
Ogelle was launched in 2019, its parent company, Reddot Television Network Limited was founded by Osita Oparaugo. Ogelle had its launch event in Lagos Nigeria in April 2019 and in Accra, Ghana in May 2019. Ogelle has its headquarters in Rwanda and office in Nigeria. The name 'Ogelle" was derived from the Igbo word Ogelle which means "Gong".

Features

User features 
Ogelle allows users to upload, view, rate, share, add to playlists, and comment on videos. It offers a wide variety of user-generated and corporate media videos. Available content includes video clips, TV show clips, music videos, short and documentary films, audio recordings, movie trailers, and other content such as video blogging, short original videos, and educational videos. Most content on Ogelle is uploaded by individuals, but media corporations offer some of their material via Ogelle as part of the Ogelle partnership program, which has a reward plan to monetize contents. Unregistered users can only watch (but not upload) videos on the site, while registered users are also permitted to upload an unlimited number of videos and add comments to videos. Age-restricted videos are available only to registered users affirming themselves to be at least 18 years old.

Ogelle vocation 
Ogelle introduced the vocational education content feature to enable users learn vocational skills and knowledge.

References

External links 
 

Internet properties established in 2019
Nigerian entertainment websites
Video on demand services